The tubal branches of ovarian artery are arteries providing blood to the Fallopian tube.

It anastomoses with the tubal branch of uterine artery.

References

Angiology